The tournaments of the qualifications for the 2022 Men's European Water Polo Championship were held between 17 and 20 February 2022. 17 teams, split into four groups, participated in the qualifications. The top two teams from each group advanced to the final tournament.

Group A

All times are (UTC+1).

Group B

All times are (UTC+4).

Group C

All times are (UTC+1).

Group D

All times are (UTC+2).

See also
2022 Women's European Water Polo Championship Qualifiers

References

2022 European Water Polo Championship